Oda Balsborg was a Danish operatic soprano. She was born in Copenhagen on 12 January 1934 and died there on 2 September 2014, aged 80.

Her repertoire included the roles of Clorinda in La Cenerentola, the First Lady in The Magic Flute and Woglinde in Das Rheingold. On record, in the last of these roles, she is heard singing the opening words in the first published recording of the work, conducted by Georg Solti in 1958. Earlier, Balsborg sang Gerhilde in Solti's recording of act 3 of Die Walküre in which Kirsten Flagstad sang Brünnhilde.

References

Sources 
 

1934 births
2014 deaths
Singers from Copenhagen
Danish operatic sopranos